Ramapo High School can refer to:
Ramapo High School (New Jersey)
Ramapo High School (New York)